Avatar: The Way of Water (Original Motion Picture Soundtrack) is the soundtrack album to the 2022 epic science fiction film Avatar: The Way of Water, directed and co-produced by James Cameron, a sequel to Avatar (2009). The album featured an original score composed by Simon Franglen and original music by Canadian singer–songwriter the Weeknd. Franglen, a friend of composer James Horner who previously composed the score for Avatar, had worked as a record producer and arranger for that film and afterwards, took on scoring duties for The Way of Water and the forthcoming sequels in Avatar franchise, following Horner's death in a plane crash on June 2015.

The album, which accompanies Franglen's original score, featured two original songs—"Song Chord" performed by Franglen and Zoe Saldaña, and "Nothing Is Lost (You Give Me Strength)" performed by The Weeknd. The latter was released as a single from the album on December 15, 2022, and the following day, on December 16, the full soundtrack was released by Hollywood Records alongside the film. A score album titled Avatar: The Way of Water (Original Score), featuring additional tracks from Franglen's score was released on December 20.

Development 
Avatar composer James Horner intended to be part of the sequel as well as the forthcoming films in the franchise, before his death in a plane crash on June 22, 2015. Simon Franglen who associated with Horner as a record producer and arranger in of his films, reported to score for the film in December 2019. His involvement was officially confirmed by Landau on August 2021, where he would compose for all of the forthcoming films. Franglen had notably completed the score for The Magnificent Seven (2016), post-Horner's death. He also composed the original score for Pandora – The World of Avatar, the theme park attraction based on the film, and also arranged Horner's theme from the film, as Franglen wanted to "keep the core of the film's music together". Hence, by 2017, he was ready to score for the film when Cameron asked him to read the scripts for the sequels. 

Franglen wanted to honor the legacy of Horner, by bringing new themes into the score, adding that "The vast majority of it is fresh and new because it’s a new film, and there are new characters in those new places. But there are moments when it’s important to have the original themes there. I hope that the fans of the original will like and recognize that we’ve tried to keep that because also there’s a flow for a series of films. Avatar isn’t a standalone film. It’s part of a whole canon of movies, we hope. Therefore, bringing some of the score from A1 into A2 I thought was appropriate and a good thing to do." 

Franglen added that he was able to design unique Pandoran musical instruments for the film, which was one of the "unexpected delights". which has been three dimensionally printed by the art department and the props team. He was tasked on bringing new textures, voices and elements the score, adding "The sea is integral to many of the themes and motifs in my score; the scintillation of light, the ebb and flow of waves, and the connection of the Na’vi [characters in the movie] with the water were all inspirations".

Recording for the film's score began on July 29, 2022 at the Newman Scoring Stage at 20th Century Studios in Los Angeles, with a 100-piece orchestra recording the score. Franglen said that he was able to "feature a great diversity of singers and featured musicians from across the world, all bringing their unique textures to the score", such as bringing the Tenebrae choir ensemble from London and Pacific islands choral music. The scale of the music mixing exceeded up to 1,000 tracks.

Original songs 
The Way of Water featured two original songs, co-written and produced by Franglen. "The Songcord" performed by Zoe Saldaña, was announced at the nominations for 13th Hollywood Music in Media Awards in the Best Original Song in a Feature Film in November 2022. Cameron described the song on the first page of the script, where it refers to "telling the story of the Na’vi family or clan ancestry through song, accompanied by a device with beads strung together on twine or thread". He further suggested Franglen that the song needed an "ancient haunting quality with the warmth of a mother's love". Hence, he wrote the lyrics of the song in Na’vi and performed live on the stage with Saldaña in front of 100 crew members.

"Nothing Is Lost (You Give Me Strength)" is the end credits song for the film, which Cameron wanted it to be "hopeful and about fighting for the survival of family". Franglen roped Canadian singer the Weeknd to perform the track and sent him thematic and lyrical concepts, where he wanted to bridge the world of Pandora with the musician. Additionally, the Swedish supergroup Swedish House Mafia helped Franglen in producing the song, so as to blend their distinctive pop sensibility, with the Na’vi voices, tribal drums, and the orchestra, that covered the musical world. Weeknd recorded the final vocals for the song in Los Angeles, while the orchestral portions were recorded at the Newman Scoring Stage, during the final scoring sessions in November 2022.

Release and promotion 
The soundtrack to Avatar: The Way of Water was released alongside the film on December 16, 2022 by Hollywood Records, with "Nothing Is Lost (You Give Me Strength)" serving as the lead single from the album released on December 15. The album featured 20 tracks from Franglen's original score, with 10 additional tracks released in a separate score album on December 20.

Track listing

Reception 
The film's soundtrack received largely positive reviews from critics. In a review from New York Post, Johnny Oleksinski wrote "Pandora also continues to be brought to life through music that, while composed this time by Simon Franglen, still bows to the wondrous work of the late James Horner". David Rooney of The Hollywood Reporter said that the film "misses the heart-pounding suspense and tribal themes of James Horner’s score for the 2009 film, but composer Simon Franglen capably maintains the tension where it counts".

Accolades

References 

2022 soundtrack albums
Hollywood Records soundtracks
Avatar (franchise)
Science fiction film soundtracks